Feihyla kajau, also known as the Dring's flying frog, white-eared tree frog, and white-eared jelly-nest frog, is a species of frog in the family Rhacophoridae. It is endemic to Borneo and found in all major jurisdictions of the island Kalimantan (Indonesia), Sabah and Sarawak (Malaysia), and Brunei. The specific name kajau is Berawan for "charming".

Description
The body is slender. The snout is very short and blunt. The tympanum is small and inconspicuous. The finger and toe tips are broadly rounded. The outer fingers have basal webbing the toes are half-webbed. Skin is dorsally finely shagreened. The dorsum is green above, abruptly ending at flanks, and brown posteriorly in the pelvic region, scattered white dots above. The venter is white anteriorly and transparent posteriorly. The iris is silvery below and golden above, with some dark reticulation and golden ring around pupil that is horizontally oval.

The male advertisement call is soft and high-pitched. Dorsum of tadpoles is brown with scattering of light bronze pigmentation on trunk and forehead. Underside of the tadpole is transparent and internal organs are visible. Eyes are positioned dorsolaterally.

Habitat and conservation
Individuals can be found perching on low vegetation overhanging small, rocky streams or swampy, muddy pools. Eggs are laid on the surface of leaves in clutches of approximately 7–10.

Feihyla kajau can be common in suitable habitat. Parts of its range are threatened by logging concessions, small scale subsistence logging, oil palm plantations, and property development. It is present in a number of protected areas.

References

External links
 Sound recordings of Rhacophorus kajau at BioAcoustica

kajau
Endemic fauna of Borneo
Amphibians of Borneo
Amphibians of Brunei
Amphibians of Indonesia
Amphibians of Malaysia
Amphibians described in 1983
Taxonomy articles created by Polbot